Dondapadu is a neighbourhood and a part of Urban Notified Area of Amaravati, the state capital of the Indian state of Andhra Pradesh. It was a village in Thullur mandal of Guntur district, prior to its denotification as gram panchayat. It has a beautiful temple dedicated to lord Ganesh (the son of Parvati and Shiva) built by Sri Nannapaneni Surya Prakash Rao garu and Pushpavathi garu in the year 2007.

Transport

Dondapadu lies on north east of Gudivada town. Although there are no bus services available, frequent auto service is available. This village is approximately 6.5 km from Gudivada which is the nearest census town.

References 

Neighbourhoods in Amaravati